Onias Childs Skinner (July 21, 1817 – February 4, 1877) was an American jurist and legislator.

Born in Floyd, New York, Skinner moved to Peoria, Illinois in 1836. He then moved to Greenville, Ohio where he studied law and was admitted to the Ohio bar; Skinner served as deputy marshall of Darke County, Ohio.. In 1842, Skinner moved to Carthage, Illinois and then in 1844 moved to Quincy, Illinois where he stayed for the rest of his life. Skinner served in the Illinois House of Representatives from 1849 to 1851. In 1851, Skinner was elected an Illinois circuit court judge. From 1855 to 1858, Skinner served on the Illinois Supreme Court. Skinner served in the Illinois Constitutional Convention of 1870. Skinner died in Quincy, Illinois.

Notes

1817 births
1877 deaths
People from Carthage, Illinois
People from Quincy, Illinois
People from Oneida County, New York
People from Greenville, Ohio
Ohio lawyers
Illinois state court judges
Justices of the Illinois Supreme Court
Members of the Illinois House of Representatives
19th-century American politicians
19th-century American judges
19th-century American lawyers